William Emmanuel Abraham, also known as Willie E. Abraham or, to give his day name, Kojo Abraham (born on Monday, 28 May 1934), is a retired Ghanaian philosopher.

Biography
Abraham was educated at the Government Boys' School and Adisadel Secondary School in Cape Coast, Ghana. He obtained a BA from the University of Ghana, graduating with first-class honours in philosophy in 1957. Travelling to England to study at Oxford University, he received a B.Phil. and was the first African to be elected a Fellow of All Souls College. In 1960 he was nominated to be a Governor of the School of Oriental and African Studies, London University.

On his return to Ghana in 1962 he joined the Department of Philosophy at the University of Ghana, and published his book The Mind of Africa, a philosophical work arguing for Pan-Africanism. He was elected vice-president of the Ghana Academy of Arts and Sciences in 1963, in that capacity visiting scientific facilities in the Soviet Union in a seven-week tour in the summer of 1963. He became a close associate of Kwame Nkrumah, collaborating on Nkrumah's work Consciencism, published in 1964. Abraham replaced Conor Cruise O'Brien as Vice-Chancellor of the University of Ghana in September 1965. He also chaired a commission that reported in 1964 on "alleged irregularities and malpractices in connection with the issue of import licences", and was a non-resident lecturer in African Studies at the Kwame Nkrumah Ideological Institute from 1963 until its closure in 1966.

It was Willie Abraham, not Nkrumah, who wrote the book, Consciencism. Soon after the book was first published in 1964, the people who knew Nkrumah and Willie Abraham said it was Abraham, not Nkrumah who wrote the book. As Ama Biney stated in her doctoral thesis, Kwame Nkrumah: An Intellectual Biography:

"There is considerable speculation that Nkrumah was not the writer of this book and rather Prof. William Abraham was instead the author....The impenetrable style of writing is unlike that of Nkrumah's other more accessible works." – (Ama B. Biney, Kwame Nkrumah: An Intellectual Biography, doctoral thesis, University of London, 2007, p. 231).

Identified as "Nkrumah's court philosopher", Abraham was arrested in the 1966 coup which established Joseph Arthur Ankrah as president.  He emigrated to the United States and held academic positions at Macalaster College and the University of California, Santa Cruz, where he is currently Professor Emeritus of Philosophy. He has had a life-long interest in the life and work of the eighteenth-century Ghanaian philosopher Anton Wilhelm Amo.

Works
 The Mind of Africa, Chicago: Chicago University Press, 1962
 "Ideologies in Contemporary Africa", The Ghanaian Times, 7, 11, 21, 24 December 1963.
 "Political Education is Essential", The Ghanaian Times, 24 October 1964.
 "The Life and Times of Wilhelm Anton Amo", Transactions of the Historical Society of Ghana, vol. 7 (1964), pp. 60–81.
 "The Role of the Press in the Transition to Socialism", pp. 43–51 in W.M. Sulemann-Sibidow, The African Journalist (Winneba: Kwame Nkrumah Ideological Institute, 1965).
 Speech at the launching of Kwame Nkrumah, Neo-colonialism: the last stage of imperialism, The Spark, no. 161, 19 November 1965.
 "Kwame Relies on the Masses", The Nkrumaist, vol. 4 no. 1 (January 1966), pp. 11–14.

References

External links
 Speeches at the launching of Consciencism, 2 April 1964

1934 births
Living people
Alumni of All Souls College, Oxford
Ghanaian philosophers
University of Ghana alumni